Sporobolus michauxianus is a species of cordgrass known as prairie cordgrass, freshwater cordgrass, tall marshgrass, and sloughgrass. It is native to much of North America, including central and eastern Canada and most of the contiguous United States except for the southwestern and southeastern regions. Its distribution extends into Mexico. It is also present on other continents as an introduced species.

Description
This species of grass has hard, sturdy, hollow stems that may reach  in height. They grow from a network of woody rhizomes and tough roots that form a sod. The roots penetrate over  into the soil. The leaves have sharp, serrated edges. This grass can spread via its rhizome, producing large monotypic stands.

Habitat and ecology
This species can grow in a variety of habitat types, but it is a facultative wetland species, most often found in wet habitats. These include fens, wet prairies, rivers, floodplains, ponds, moraines, and marshes. The grass is tolerant of water, but it does not tolerate prolonged flooding. Its dense root network stabilizes soil, even in areas where it would be eroded by flowing water.

The larvae of Photedes inops host on Spartina pectinata, apparently exclusively.

Uses
Livestock may graze on this plant when it is young, but once it matures it becomes very coarse and unpalatable.

This species has been investigated as a possible source of biofuel.

References

michauxianus
Flora of North America